Stella Maris High School was an all-girls, private, Roman Catholic high school on the Rockaway Peninsula in Queens, New York. It was located within the Roman Catholic Diocese of Brooklyn.  The highlight event of this school was "Blue And Gold," a school spirit event where the freshman and seniors competed against the sophomores and juniors in a series of events. This school overlooked a beautiful beach scenery and the Atlantic Ocean.

Background
Stella Maris was established in 1943 by the Sisters of St. Joseph.

The school had an estimated 500 students coming from all over the peninsula. The teacher-to-student ratio was one teacher to every twelve students. The tuition was $7,300 per year. Stella Maris was affiliated with Adelphi University and St. John's University for fifteen credits. In the high school was a junior high school called Maura Clarke Junior High School Program. This program closed in 2008.

It was announced on October 19, 2009 that Stella Maris HS would close in June 2010, because of low enrollment. In June 2010 Stella Maris High School graduated its last class and closed its doors, after 67 years of educating the young women of the Rockaway Peninsula.

References

External links
 
 

Defunct Catholic secondary schools in New York City
Rockaway, Queens
Educational institutions established in 1943
Educational institutions disestablished in 2010
Defunct girls' schools in the United States
Roman Catholic Diocese of Brooklyn
Roman Catholic high schools in Queens, New York
1943 establishments in New York City
Girls' schools in New York City